The Stade Vélodrome, known as the Orange Vélodrome for sponsorship reasons, is a multi-purpose stadium in Marseille, France. It is home to the Olympique de Marseille football club of Ligue 1 since it opened in 1937, and has been a venue in the 1938 and  1998 FIFA World Cups; the 1960, 1984 and 2016 editions of the UEFA European Championship; and the 2007 Rugby World Cup. It occasionally hosts RC Toulon rugby club of the Top 14. It is the largest club football ground in France, with a capacity of 67,394 spectators. The stadium is also used regularly by the France national rugby union team.

The record attendance for a club game before renovation at the Stade Vélodrome was 58,897 in a UEFA Cup semi-final against Newcastle United in 2004. Since expansion to 67,394, the record attendance at the ground now stands at 65,894 for the match against rivals Paris Saint-Germain that occurred on 26 February 2023. The first-ever match to be played was between Marseille and Torino in 1937.

The French rugby union team began an impressive run of victories at the stadium in the early 2000s. They defeated New Zealand 42–33 in November 2000, and in 2001 defeated Australia by one point. They beat South Africa in 2002, followed by a win over England in 2003. However, their run of luck was broken in 2004 when they lost 14–24 to Argentina. The venue was used by France for a game against New Zealand in November 2009. In 2018, the stadium hosted its first Six Nations match with France hosting Italy.

France is not the only rugby team to have used the Vélodrome in recent years. On 18 April 2009, Toulon took their home fixture in the Top 14 against Toulouse to the Vélodrome, drawing 57,039 spectators to see a 14–6 Toulon win which played a key role in the Toulonnais' successful fight against relegation in the 2008–09 season. Toulon has taken two home matches to the Vélodrome in each of the succeeding two seasons. The Vélodrome was also the venue for both semi-finals in the 2010–11 Top 14 season, and was used for the Toulon v Munster semi-final of the 2013–14 Heineken Cup. On 28 May 2022, The Velodrome hosted the Champions Cup Final between La Rochelle v Leinster in front of 59,682 spectators.

History 

In 1935, the architectural firm Pollack Ploquin was chosen to build a stadium in Marseille. Henri Ploquin (who designed in 1932 with Charles Bouhana the Stade Municipal Louis Darragon) designed the stadium. For economic reasons, only the Stade Vélodrome was built. On 28 April 1935, the foundation stone was laid for the Vélodrome by Marseille Mayor Ribot, on a site between downtown and the suburban areas of St. Giniez and Sainte-Marguerite on military grounds belonging to the city. The Stade Vélodrome opened on 13 June 1937, when a friendly match was played between Olympique Marseille (OM) and Italian of Torino FC (which ended 2-1 to Olympique Marseille). On 29 August 1937 (the second day of the France national football championship) a match took place between OM and Cannes. This was the first official match at the stadium.

As its name suggests, Stade Vélodrome was used for cycling competitions but as these races became less common, seating replaced the track which circled the stadium. The Vélodrome remained famous for fans of OM (Olympique Marseille) since the sloped track which was under the extended seating acted as a slide to invade the pitch at the end of matches.

Olympique de Marseille was long hostile to the Stade Vélodrome, calling it the "stadium of the City Council". For fans of the Olympians between the wars, the real home of OM was Stade de l'Huveaune, owned by Olympique de Marseille and partly financed by fans in the early 1920s. After World War II, however, Marseille no longer owned the Stadium Huveaune. Seeking support from the city, Chairman Marcel Leclerc had OM play at Huveaune from 1945 to 1960. The City Council then relented, and Olympique de Marseille moved to the Vélodrome. During the 1970s, OM shared the Stade with the Marseille XIII Rugby League.

First renovations

1970 marked the first modifications to the Vélodrome, with the replacement of the floodlights on the Ganay and Jean-Bouin tribunes by four 60 meter towers for nighttime events. In March 1971, the capacity of the stadium was increased by nearly 6000 seats, with the reduction of the cycling track and the removal of the cinder running track. This brought the total capacity of the stadium to 55,000 people, including the standing area.

Olympique returned to the Stade de l'Huveaune for the 1982–1983 season as Stade Vélodrome was under construction in preparation for the UEFA Euro 1984. The playing surface was completely replaced during this time. The semifinal between France and Portugal had set a record for attendance at an international match with 54,848 spectators. The capacity of the stadium was later reduced to 42,000 with the construction of lodges.

The cycling track was removed altogether once Bernard Tapie was appointed president of OM in 1985. He chose to remove it and rearrange the corners of the stadium, bringing the capacity up to 48,000. This renovation marked the end of the era of Vélodrome as a multi-use facility. The area around the stadium was also transformed with the creation of the second line of the metro which served the stadium from two stations and with the construction of the Palais des Sports nearby.

1998 World Cup and beyond

The Vélodrome hosted the final draw, which took place on 4 December 1997 (the first time the final draw was held in an outdoor venue) and seven matches, including France's first match against South Africa, the quarterfinal between Argentina and the Netherlands and the semifinal between Brazil and the Netherlands.
As of 2011, the record attendance for a football game (58,897 spectators) was the Newcastle United UEFA Cup semifinal on 6 May 2004 (2–0). During the 2007 Rugby World Cup the Vélodrome hosted six games, including two quarter-finals: Australia versus England (which holds the overall attendance record with 59,120 spectators) and South Africa versus Fiji. On 16 July 2009, during preparations for a Madonna concert, one of four winches used to hoist the structure failed; the 60-ton roof fell (leaving two dead, eight wounded and crushing a crane).

Widely criticized and unloved by the Marseillais for its architecture (no roof, exposure to strong mistral winds and poor acoustics), the Stade Vélodrome has since 2003 been the subject of several projects to modernize and enlarge it. In July 2009, following an extraordinary council of the City of Marseille concerning the City Hall renovation project, a motion was passed launching a public-private partnership (PPP). On 21 June 2010, following France's winning bid for UEFA Euro 2016, Marseille announced that the stadium would receive another renovation (a roof and an increase in capacity from 60,031 to 67,000), making it a UEFA Elite Stadium. Works began in the spring of 2011 and were completed in summer 2014.

Attendance
In 2002, Division 1 was renamed Ligue 1. Olympique de Marseille's average attendance for each season since 2000–01 is listed below:

Tournament results

1938 FIFA World Cup matches

1960 European Nations' Cup

UEFA Euro 1984

1998 FIFA World Cup

2007 Rugby World Cup matches
The Vélodrome hosted 6 games of the 2007 Rugby World Cup which was hosted by France including two quarter-final games.

UEFA Euro 2016 matches

The Vélodrome hosted six games at UEFA Euro 2016, including a semi-final. In 2016, the stadium became the first in Europe to have hosted three European Championship semi-finals after France's previous hosting of the tournament in 1960 and 1984.

2023 Rugby World Cup matches

Structure

The four stands in the stadium are named after athletes (runner Jean Bouin and 1920s cyclist Gustave Ganay), a historical figure of the 1720 plague epidemic (Chevalier Roze) and a popular Olympique de Marseille supporter (Patrice De Peretti, nicknamed "Depe", who died suddenly in July 2000).

Rugby League
Other than the Rugby League World Cup games in 1954, 1972 and 1975, 14 other test matches were played at the stadium between 1938 and 1985. The France national team played in 16 of the internationals played at Stade Vélodrome.

Rugby League World Cup
Over three separate tournaments, the Vélodrome also hosted games of the Rugby League World Cup.

Rugby League Test matches
List of rugby league test matches played at Stade Vélodrome.

Location and accessibility
The stadium is four kilometres from the Old Port of Marseille, in the neighbourhoods of Sainte-Marguerite and Saint-Giniez in the southern part of Marseille. It is bound to the south by the Huveaune river and to the north by the Parc Chanot and the headquarters of regional public TV station, France 3 Provence-Alpes. To its west runs the Boulevard Michelet and to the east the Marseille Palais des Sports and the Delort stadium.

The Vélodrome is serviced by the bus and metro networks of the Régie des transports de Marseille. Besides several bus services operating in the area, two stations of the Marseille Metro line 2 are close to the stadium. Supporters wishing to reach the Ganay or North stands must alight at the Sainte-Marguerite Dromel station whereas the Rond-Point du Prado station caters for the South stand and the Jean-Bouin stand. This line, which also serves the Marseille Saint-Charles train station, has additional trains on matchdays.

Marseille Provence Airport is thirty kilometres from the Vélodrome.

Current situation 

The Stade Vélodrome has increased its seating capacity in 2014 (in prevision of the UEFA Euro 2016 hosted by France), and continues to host games for Olympique de Marseille. Previously it held 60,031 spectators; following its renovation, it is now able to hold 67,000, including 7,000 VIP seats. The cost of the project was €267 million. The expansion and modernization of equipment was part of the French bid to organize Euro 2016. Marseille mayor Jean-Claude Gaudin's bid also provided for the creation of a new district.

Construction
Marseille has increased the stadium's capacity and installed a roof, as required by UEFA standards. The project also includes multiple reception areas and media space, better access for the disabled and better seating. The new stadium has been officially inaugurated on 16 October 2014.

Approaches
The esplanade Ganay has been preserved and refurbished. The RTM car park has been replaced with office towers and housing. RTM users benefit from a larger underground car park. Trees and wind turbines contribute to a new-neighbourhood HQE (high environmental quality).

Cost
The total project estimate is €267 million, with €150M for the stadium and the remnant for the surrounding shopping mall, hotel and housing, the private sector to cover two-thirds of the investment; the remainder will be shared by the region, the department of Bouches-du-Rhône, MPM and the city of Marseille for 20m euros. The French government contributed to upgrade the area's infrastructure. After several studies, the mayor selected the contract of partnership arrangements included in a PPP (public-private partnership).

Olympique de Marseille
"Olympique de Marseille will be closely associated with the project", said Jean-Claude Gaudin. The club remains a tenant of the stadium. Elected officials want ticket prices to be controlled.

Naming rights
The naming rights for the stadium were bought by French telecommunications multinational Orange. The 10-year-deal was announced on 3 June 2016 by the Mayor of Marseille. The deal is reported to be worth €2.7 million annually.

Gallery

See also
List of football stadiums in France 
List of European stadia by capacity
List of association football stadiums by capacity
Ion Oblemenco Stadium

References

External links

Orange Velodrome

Olympique de Marseille
Sports venues in Marseille
1938 FIFA World Cup stadiums
1998 FIFA World Cup stadiums
1960 European Nations' Cup stadiums
Velodrome
Velodrome
Velodrome
Velodrome
Rugby League World Cup stadiums
Velodromes in France
UEFA Euro 2016 stadiums
UEFA Euro 1984 stadiums
Sports venues completed in 1937
Olympic football venues
Venues of the 2024 Summer Olympics
1937 establishments in France